The Poqomam are a Maya people in Guatemala and El Salvador. Their indigenous language is also called Poqomam and is closely related to Poqomchiʼ. Notable Poqomam settlements are located in Chinautla (Guatemala (department)), Palín (Escuintla), and in San Luis Jilotepeque (Jalapa). Before the Spanish Conquest, the Poqomam had their capital at Chinautla Viejo. The Poqomam that advanced further east, to the territories of present-day El Salvador, were largely displaced by the migration of the Pipil people in the 11th century. The few Poqomam that remained in El Salvador live near the Guatemala border, in the departments of Santa Ana and Ahuachapan.

See also
 Mixco Viejo

Notes

References

 
 

Indigenous peoples in Guatemala
Maya peoples
Mesoamerican cultures